Sir Richard Joseph Buxton, PC (born 13 July 1938) is a British judge and former Lord Justice of Appeal. He was appointed to the High Court of Justice on 11 January 1994, serving in the Queen's Bench Division. He was subsequently appointed to the Court of Appeal of England and Wales on 1 October 1997. He retired on 30 September 2008.

From 19 May 1991 to 4 November 1996 he was a director of the Blenheim Court Residents Company (Woodstock). He was also a director of The Incorporated Council of Law Reporting for England and Wales from 20 September 1993 to 7 July 2008.

He is an honorary member of the Society of Legal Scholars and an honorary fellow of Exeter College, Oxford.

Legal cases
In April 2011 he ruled on a dispute between the Catholic Church and the parents of Cardinal Vaughan Memorial School. He criticised both parties for failing to resolve the issues between themselves and for bringing a case that was a drain on public resources. In December 2011 he refused an application for appeal from the Daily Telegraph over a libel case involving Sarah Thornton.

References

1938 births
Living people
British King's Counsel
Members of the Privy Council of the United Kingdom
Knights Bachelor
Lords Justices of Appeal
Queen's Bench Division judges
Alumni of Exeter College, Oxford